Markus Hasler (born 3 October 1971 in Eschen) is a Liechtensteiner cross-country skier who has competed since 1992. His best World Cup finish was third in a sprint event in Italy in 2001.

Hasler also competed in five Winter Olympics, earning his best finish of 11th in the 15 km + 15 km double pursuit event at Turin in 2006. His best finish at the FIS Nordic World Ski Championships was fourth in the 10 km + 10 km double pursuit event at Val di Fiemme in 2003.

References
FIS-Ski.com profile

1971 births
Cross-country skiers at the 1992 Winter Olympics
Cross-country skiers at the 1994 Winter Olympics
Cross-country skiers at the 1998 Winter Olympics
Cross-country skiers at the 2002 Winter Olympics
Cross-country skiers at the 2006 Winter Olympics
Liechtenstein male cross-country skiers
Living people
Olympic cross-country skiers of Liechtenstein